The River Rye or Ryewater is a tributary of the River Liffey. It rises in County Meath, flowing south-east for 19 miles. Although the river has been the subject of arterial drainage schemes, it is generally fast flowing over a stoney bottom. The Rye's major tributary is the Lyreen.

Route

The Rye runs north of Kilcock and Maynooth. Maynooth Castle is built between the Lyreen and its tributary the Joan Slade River. The Lyreen and Rye meet to the east of Maynooth and flow on through the estate of Carton House. In the estate, the river was widened to form an ornamental lake within the Georgian parklands, further enhanced by an ornamental bridge and boathouse.

The river then flows behind Intel Ireland where Intel have been monitoring the water quality since 1989.

Near Louisa Bridge in Leixlip the waters from the Leixlip Spa flow into Rye River. There is also an overflow from the canal. The Rye then flows under the Royal Canal, which is carried in the Leixlip aqueduct almost 100 feet (30m) above. The aqueduct is in fact an earth embankment, which took six years to build in the 1790s.

The Rye then descends into the heart of Leixlip. Here the river was harnessed by mills. In 1758, the site was used as a linen printing mill. Later the Rye Vale distillery was built, producing more than 20,000 gallons of whiskey annually in 1837. The distillery finally closed for good in the 1890s and the distillery has since been converted into apartments. The Rye then flows under the Rye Bridge to the confluence with the Liffey near the existing Boat House of Leixlip demesne.

Fishing
The river has stocks of brown trout and pike. Angling is available at a number of locations, including a stretch belonging to Intel and managed by the Leixlip and District Angling Association, an open section also near Leixlip, and at Carton House.

References

External links
 Trout Angler: Rye Water
 Intel Ireland and the Rye
 Intel Report: The Remarkable Rye River 
 National Parks and Wildlife Service: Rye Water/Carton SAC

Rivers of County Kildare
River Liffey (system)